K-1 World Grand Prix 2009 in Seoul Final 16 was a martial arts event held by the K-1 on Saturday, September 26, 2009 at the Olympic Gymnastics Arena in Seoul, Korea. It was the Final Elimination tournament for top sixteen fighters. The winners qualified for the K-1 World Grand Prix 2009 Final held on December 5, 2009 at Yokohama Arena, Japan.

The eight finalists from K-1 World Grand Prix 2008 Final were automatically qualified, except Gokhan Saki who could not compete due to an injury, the eighth spot was filled by K-1 Super-heavyweight champion, Semmy Schilt, then four World GP 2009 tournament winners from the Yokohama, Lodz, Seoul and Final 16 Qualifying GP. The last four spots were selected by fan voting.

Results

See also
List of K-1 events
List of K-1 champions
List of male kickboxers

References

External links
K-1 Final 16 Official site
K-1 Official site

K-1 events
2009 in kickboxing
Kickboxing in South Korea
Sport in Seoul